The South Busway is a two-lane bus rapid transit highway serving southern portions of the city of Pittsburgh. It is owned and maintained by Pittsburgh Regional Transit, the public transit provider for Allegheny County and the Pittsburgh region.

Background 
In the 1960s, the Port Authority began phasing out streetcar lines and replacing them with buses. The creation of a rail rapid transit system was also discussed, and one of the target routes was a corridor bordering Route 51 through the Brookline and Overbrook neighborhoods. While light rail would be developed during the following decade, the Port Authority decided to use the corridor to allows buses to avoid the crowded, narrow, and stop light-filled Route 51. In 1977, a two-lane route was constructed in a valley close to the road. Unlike later American busways, including the city's Martin Luther King Jr. East Busway (opened in 1983) and West Busway (opened in 2000), the route was not designed as a route in itself and does not feature the amenities associated with modern BRTs, such as branded buses, special stations, or other rail-like features. Instead, standard bus shelters are included and no routes terminate at the end of the busway. The main goal of the road is to allow for suburban buses to operate more quickly and to encourage the use of public transportation by allowing riders to avoid a highly congested highway.  Following the naming convention of each busway being designated by a color, bus routes that use the South Busway begin with a "Y" for yellow.

The busway shared portions of its right of way with the city's light rail line.  A section from the Glenbury to the South Bank stops was shared with the Overbrook line, and another section just after the Pioneer Avenue stop continues to share right of way from that point to South Hills Junction with the Beechview line.  In 1993, the Overbrook line was suspended, and the right of way was exclusively busway.  When the Overbrook line was rebuilt, it did not resume sharing the busway, rather, a new grade-separated private right of way was built parallel to the busway, with only the South Bank stop serving as the connection point between the rail line and busway.

The Institute for Transportation and Development Policy (ITDP), under its BRT Standard, has classified the South Busway as a "Basic BRT" corridor.

Routes 
Nine routes travel the busway. The Yellow colored "Y" routes serve the length of the busway, entering and exiting at its southern terminus at Glenbury station. Four local routes (39 Brookline, 40 Mt Washington, 41 Bower Hill, and 44 Knoxville) branch of off the busway to serve city neighborhoods. From north to south, all routes use the Mount Washington Transit Tunnel, Routes 40 and 44 enter and exit the busway at Warrington Avenue (just before Palm Garden station), route 41 enters and exits using a spur ramp to Liberty Avenue serving Dawn station before returning to city streets, and route 39 enters and exits at a ramp to Pioneer Avenue just before the Pioneer Station.

Stations

See also 
Martin Luther King Jr. East Busway
West Busway
Pittsburgh Light Rail

References

External links 

Port Authority Customer Information – South Busway

Port Authority of Allegheny County
Bus rapid transit in Pennsylvania